A Night in Tunisia is a studio album by Art Blakey and the Jazz Messengers, released in May 1961 through Blue Note Records. It was recorded in August 1960 at Van Gelder Studio in Englewood Cliffs, New Jersey.

In the original liner notes by Barbara J. Gardner, she wrote: "This album is a prime example of Blakey's expressed desire to showcase his young talent. Not only is there extended solo room for the musicians; further, all but the title tune were written and arranged by the talented junior jazz citizens in his group".

Reception
The contemporaneous DownBeat reviewer praised the soloing, and highlighted Blakey's playing on "Kozo's Waltz": "His solo is truly a remarkable demonstration of modern drumming. This is searing passion and astounding energy, not to mention impeccable time".

Track listing
 "A Night in Tunisia" (D. Gillespie, F. Paparelli) – 11:16
 "Sincerely Diana" (Wayne Shorter) – 6:50
 "So Tired" (Bobby Timmons) – 6:39
 "Yama" (Lee Morgan) – 6:23
 "Kozo's Waltz" (Lee Morgan) – 6:49

1989 remastered release:
 "A Night in Tunisia" (D. Gillespie, F. Paparelli) – 11:11
 "Sincerely Diana" (Wayne Shorter) – 6:47
 "Sincerely Diana" (alternative take) (Wayne Shorter) – 6:56
 "So Tired" (Bobby Timmons) – 6:36
 "Yama" (Lee Morgan) – 6:20
 "Kozo's Waltz" (Lee Morgan) – 6:45
 "When Your Lover Has Gone" (Einar Aaron Swan) – 6:46

2013 Japanese SHM-CD:
 "A Night in Tunisia" – 11:16
 "Sincerely Diana" – 6:50
 "So Tired" – 6:39
 "Yama" – 6:23
 "Kozo's Waltz" – 6:49
 "When Your Lover Has Gone" – 6:46
 "Sincerely Diana" [Alt. Take] – 6:56

Personnel
Art Blakey – drums
Lee Morgan – trumpet
Wayne Shorter – tenor saxophone
Bobby Timmons – piano
Jymie Merritt – bass

References 

1961 albums
Art Blakey albums
The Jazz Messengers albums
Blue Note Records albums
Albums produced by Alfred Lion
Albums recorded at Van Gelder Studio
Albums produced by Michael Cuscuna